Nakano Station (中野駅; Nakano Eki) is the name of three train stations in Japan.

 Nakano Station (Gunma) in Midori, Gunma Prefecture
 Nakano Station (Nagano) in Ueda, Nagano Prefecture
 Nakano Station (Tokyo) in Nakano, Tokyo

Other similarly named stations include:
 Aki-Nakano Station in Aki-ku, Hiroshima, Hiroshima Prefecture
 Kazusa-Nakano Station in Otaki, Isumi District, Chiba Prefecture
 Rikuchu-Nakano Station in Kunohe District, Iwate Prefecture
 Shinshū-Nakano Station in Nakano, Nagano Prefecture
 Nakano Sakaue Station

Station formerly called Nakano Station (名香野駅):
 Nishitetsu Chihaya Station in Higashi-ku, Fukuoka, Fukuoka Prefecture